Psilogramma macromera is a moth of the  family Sphingidae. It is known from Malaysia.

References

Psilogramma
Moths described in 1882
Endemic fauna of Malaysia